The sombrero calañés or sombrero de Calañas is a traditional hat made in the municipality of  Calañas, province of Huelva, autonomous community of Andalusia, Spain. It is also sometimes called the sombrero castoreño because it is traditionally made from the felt of a beaver (castor) or similar animal.

The sombrero calañés has a low conical crown and a brim upturned to the point of rolling over, with a knobby ornamentation at the top of the crown and on one side of the brim. The low crown can be adjusted by a cord. The hat is worn cocked somewhat asymmetrically, and is more decorative than practical.

The term can apply to a somewhat different style of hat, more like a sombrero de catite without quite such a high conical crown, and with a sort of a small pompom dangling from a cord at the top, which falls to one side of the hat.

Either type is often worn over a kerchief tied at the nape of the neck.

Notes

External links 
Photographs of the two main types of sombrero calañés: 1 and 2
Photograph showing a  sombrero calañés worn over a kerchief

Hats
Andalusian culture
Spanish clothing
Province of Huelva